South Burnie is a locality and suburb of Burnie in the local government area of City of Burnie, in the North West region of Tasmania. The Bass Highway passes from south-east to north-west along the shore of Bass Strait, which forms part of the northern boundary. The Emu River forms part of the eastern boundary. The 2016 census determined a population of 331 for the state suburb of South Burnie.

History
The municipal area of City of Burnie, of which South Burnie is part, was proclaimed a city on 26 Apr 1988. It was previously named Emu Bay Municipality. The municipality and the bay to its north were named for the Emu River, which was named in 1827 for emu tracks seen in the vicinity. Burnie, and thus South Burnie, was named for William Burnie, who was the Director of the Van Diemen's Land Company.

Road infrastructure
The C112 route (Massy-Greene Drive) terminates at the Bass Highway in South Burnie. It runs south through the locality to Emu Heights, and from there provides access to the B18 route (Ridgley Highway) which leads to the Murchison Highway.

References

Suburbs of Burnie, Tasmania
Towns in Tasmania